Vladimir Pavlov (born June 1, 1976, Chelyabinsk) is a Russian political figure and a deputy of the 8th State Duma. 

In 1998, he started working at large industrial enterprises. He also was the assistant to the deputy of the Legislative Assembly of Chelyabinsk Oblast. From 2011 to 2012, Pavlov was the Minister of Industry and Mineral Resources of the Chelyabinsk Oblast. In 2017, he was appointed docent of the Higher School of Economics. From 2020 to 2021, he was the deputy of the Legislative Assembly of Chelyabinsk Oblast of the 7th convocation. Since September 2021, he has served as deputy of the 8th State Duma.

References

1965 births
Living people
United Russia politicians
21st-century Russian politicians
Eighth convocation members of the State Duma (Russian Federation)
Politicians from Chelyabinsk